Rabinranath "Robin" Mukherjee (12 November 1943 – 14 March 2009) was a cricketer who played first-class cricket for a number of teams in India from 1964 to 1980.

An opening batsman, Mukherjee played his first first-class match in 1964-65 for Railways against Jammu and Kashmir, scoring 90 not out in the second innings before his captain declared. He moved to Bengal, and in 1966-67, on his first appearance for the team, he made 111 against Bihar. In 1967-68, on his first appearance for State Bank of India in the Moin-ud-Dowlah Gold Cup Tournament, he made 183 in 260 minutes, putting on 233 for the third wicket with Hanumant Singh.

He moved to Bihar in 1969. In 1970-71 he made 288 runs at 48.00 in the Ranji Trophy as Bihar progressed to the semi-finals for only the third time. He made 58, the only score of the match over 30, as Bihar beat Assam by an innings, then 53 when Bihar gained a first-innings lead over Bengal to progress to the finals. Against Mysore in the quarter-final he scored 130 to help Bihar to a two-run first-innings lead and a place in the semi-final, which they lost to Punjab. He continued to play regularly for Bihar until 1977-78. Later he served as a selector for Bengal and as chief curator of pitches for East Zone.

He was not related to Raja Mukherjee, who played as a batsman for Bengal in the late 1960s and 1970s. They opened the batting together in 1967-68, making 112 for the first wicket in their first partnership.

References

External links
 Robin Mukherjee at CricketArchive
 

1943 births
2009 deaths
Indian cricketers
Cricketers from Kolkata
Bihar cricketers
East Zone cricketers
Railways cricketers
Bengal cricketers
State Bank of India cricketers